14A may refer to:

Fourteenth Amendment to the United States Constitution
New York State Route 14A
Delaware Route 14A
14A, part of Connecticut Route 14
14A, a Canadian motion picture rating outside Quebec